Vermont Business Magazine is a business magazine based in Burlington, Vermont.

Events 
Vermont Business Magazine hosts several events throughout the year honoring Vermont Businesses. The events include The Deane C. Davis Outstanding Vermont Business of the Year Award, The Best Places To Work Awards, The Vermont Centennial Business Awards, The Keybank/Vermont Business Magazine 5x5x5 Awards and The Small Business Administration Awards.

Annual Publications
Vermont Business Magazine collects information about Vermont businesses which it compiles into database and publishes in the Vermont Manufacturers and Business Directory, which is published annually.

References

External links

1972 establishments in Vermont
Monthly magazines published in the United States
Mass media in Burlington, Vermont
Business magazines published in the United States
Magazines established in 1972
Magazines published in Vermont